Arizona's 22nd Legislative District is one of 30 in the state, situated in north central Maricopa County. As of 2021, there are 48 precincts in the district, with a total registered voter population of 188,548. The district has an overall population of 240,808.

Political representation
The district is represented for the 2021–2022 Legislative Session in the State Senate by David Livingston (R) and in the House of Representatives by Ben Toma (R) and Frank Carroll (R).

References

Maricopa County, Arizona
Arizona legislative districts